Olive were a British trip hop group from London, England. The founding membership consisted of producer, instrumentalist and songwriter Tim Kellett, producer and keyboard programmer Robin Taylor-Firth, and singer Ruth-Ann Boyle. The band has released two albums, the second without Taylor-Firth. Their 1996 single "You're Not Alone" reached number one on the UK Singles Chart.

History

Pre formation
Two of Olive's founding members had been members of successful acts. Tim Kellett was a member of Simply Red from 1985 until 1991. Robin Taylor-Firth had decided to branch out although continuing with George Evelyn's project Nightmares on Wax. The two met through a mutual friend who had recently joined Simply Red as bassist and formed a musical collaboration.

Demos to success
By 1994, three demos (which would become "Miracle", "Falling" and "You're Not Alone") were recorded in Kellett's cellar studio, upon which the two began their search for a singer. At this time, Kellett went on tour as keyboardist with Vini Reilly's The Durutti Column, with whom he had played for a decade prior to joining Simply Red. While playing back pre-recorded keyboard samples on stage, Kellett heard a favourable vocal sample; the voice was that of Ruth-Ann Boyle, who had provided the samples for The Durutti Column's 1994 album Sex and Death.

Kellett contacted Boyle about singing for the collaboration; at the time working in a bar, and though disillusioned from past experiences singing in bands, Boyle accepted. After an audition with "Miracle", Boyle's membership in the band was set. The completion of the three initial demos attracted the interest of various UK record labels, and Olive signed with the top bidder, RCA, in September 1995.

The songwriting and recording process concluded with the completion of their first album in January 1996. The first single, "You're Not Alone," was released in 1996. It reached number one in 1997, after the release of a remixed version, selling over 500000 copies. Popularity in America and Australia was muted, with the track falling short of an American Top 40 position and being restricted to a small musical niche with Australians. "Outlaw" followed not long after, with similar responses, as well as their first album, Extra Virgin in 1997.

Riding the success of the remixed single, Extra Virgin was re-released in 1997 with a bonus disc of remixes by producers including Monkey Mafia, Roni Size, and duo Paul Oakenfold and Steve Osborne.

The band went on tour to promote the album with a seven-piece band, playing three episodes of Top of the Pops ("You're Not Alone" twice in May 1997, "Outlaw" in August), a ten-date UK tour, as well as legs in Germany and the US

In the time leading up to the release of the follow-up album, Taylor-Firth had left the group to concentrate on Nightmares on Wax, and begin other projects (Sub Machena, BudNubac, Piano Segundo) bringing it down to a duo. He also founded BlancoMusic, a release platform for the aforementioned acts, plus others such as Mil i Maria.  Meanwhile, Olive lost the support of RCA's UK branch, which dropped the band; however, they were then picked up by Madonna's Maverick Records, supposedly with Madonna's personal approval after she attended one of their concerts in Germany.

In 2000, their second album Trickle was released. The album was more dance-oriented, and a cover of the 10cc song "I'm Not in Love" reached number one on the Billboard Hot Dance Club Play chart.  The song also featured on the soundtrack to The Next Best Thing.

From that point on the band's profile became lower and the band entered an extended hiatus. Kellett focussed on songwriting for other artists so that he could spend more time with his family. Boyle joined Enigma as a vocalist and released her first solo album What About Us on 4 June 2007. It was released exclusively through iTunes.

In 2009, Tinchy Stryder released a version of 'You're Not Alone', sparking new interest in Olive. Around the same time, Digital Spy announced that Olive was working on its third album, due for release in early 2011. The album was to feature Ruth Ann on vocals once more, as well as featuring other special guest vocalists, but as of 2014, the album has not been released.

Reception
At the 1997 Ivor Novello Awards (28 May 1998), Kellett and Taylor-Firth received the Best Dance Music award for "You're Not Alone". The song was also covered as a 2002 single by German dance producer ATB.

During the American leg of the Trickle promotional tour, the band suggested that 60–70% of their audience demographic at the time was gay. This was recognised to the extent that the final show of the tour was played at the San Francisco Pride festival.

Today, Olive is generally placed alongside mid-1990s trip hop and electronica artists such as Moloko, Beth Orton, and the Sneaker Pimps.

Discography

Studio albums

Singles

1 – Released in the United States only.

Music videos

Awards

See also
List of number-one dance hits (United States)
List of artists who reached number one on the US Dance chart

References

External links
Official Maverick-era site at the Wayback Machine

Musical groups established in 1994
Musical groups disestablished in 2003
1994 establishments in England
2003 disestablishments in England
British musical trios
English dance music groups
RCA Records artists
Maverick Records artists
Musical groups from London
English electronic music groups
Ivor Novello Award winners
Trip hop groups